, also known was , was a Japanese poet and monk of the late Heian period.

Nōin authored of the Gengenshu and Nōin Utamakura.

Poetry 
One of his poems is anthologized in the Ogura Hyakunin Isshu:

Bibliography
Peter McMillan (2008) One hundred poets, one poem each : a translation of the Ogura Hyakunin Isshu. New York : Columbia University Press.

Notes

988 births
12th-century Japanese poets
1050s deaths
Hyakunin Isshu poets
The Pillow Book
Heian period Buddhist clergy
Buddhist poets